The BYD B series are a line of battery electric buses produced by Chinese vehicle manufacturer BYD. It is the first bus model powered by BYD's Lithium Iron Phosphate Blade batteries. It is available as a 10 metre single-decker (B10), a 12 metre single-decker (B12) and as a 12 metre double-decker (B12D).

History 
The BYD B series was launched on 29 July 2020, superseding the highly popular BYD K series. The bodywork was designed by Wolfgang Egger. According to BYD, the new bus models feature LED water lamps, USB charging ports, newer-generation wheel hub motors which are 6% more energy-efficient, as well as a lightweight aluminum frame reducing the body weight by up to 10%.

Operational History

Mainland China 

 Jinan: 340 B10 buses were delivered in July 2022.
 Changzhou: The first B series buses entered service in 2021.
 Shenzhen: 
 Western Bus operated a fleet of 88 B10s as of 2020.
 10 B12D double decker buses are used for tourist sightseeing services.
 Zhongshan: 50 B10s were delivered in 2022.

Asia Pacific 

 Hong Kong: 
 16 B12A buses entered service with Kowloon Motor Bus in 2022. These buses are the first B series buses built to right hand drive specifications.
 A B12D demonstrator was delivered to KMB in December 2022.
 Indonesia: 30 B12As were delivered to TransJakarta in 2022.
 Singapore: 
 In November 2022, ComfortDelGro took delivery of several B12A buses with three doors, to be used on Internal Shuttle Bus services (ISB) within the National University of Singapore and Nanyang Technological University. These buses, along with Zhongtong N12 buses which entered service earlier, will gradually replace all diesel-powered buses on ISB routes.
 A BYD B12A, also featuring three doors, was showcased at the Singapore International Transport Congress & Exhibition 2022.

Awards 
On 7 January 2022, it was announced that the BYD B10 had won the "2021 Transporter Word-of-Mouth New Energy Bus Award".

References 

BYD Auto
ebus
Buses of China
Battery electric buses
Low-floor buses